Married by America is an American reality television series broadcast by the Fox Broadcasting Company (Fox). The series premiered on March 3, 2003, and its eighth and final episode aired on April 14, 2003. American DJ Sean Valentine hosted the series. It was produced by the production company Rocket Science Laboratories (Joe Millionaire, Temptation Island).

In 2005, Married by America was one of several television programs cited in a class-action lawsuit filed by the Writers Guild of America concerning labor law violations.

Format
Five single people agreed to be paired up sight unseen with strangers chosen by America. The five newly minted couples met and got engaged on the spot. This was accomplished through family members and phone-in votes by TV viewers. The five couples were Matt and Cortez (a friendly if awkward man and an attractive/uninterested woman who later claimed she was attracted to "the abusers"), Jennifer and Xavier (cold, unfriendly blonde woman and low-key Frenchman model), Stephen and Denise (uncomfortable average guy and low self-esteem woman who liked him much more than he liked her), Jill and Kevin (NHL team hostess and Catholic "daddy's girl" and a former pro baseball player seeking a new career), and Billie Jean and Tony (party girl and general bro).

Next, the five couples were sequestered at Copper North Ranch for an engagement period. Relationship Experts (Dr. Jenn Bermann, Dr. Don Elium and Ms. P.) eliminated one couple per week, and the final two couples could decide whether or not they wanted to wed.

In the end, neither of the couples (Jill Nicolini and Kevin, Billie Jean Houle and Tony) opted to get married.

Production
On October 30, 2002, Fox sent out a press release for Married by America. The series was based on the concept of an arranged marriage, with Fox president of alternative entertainment Mike Darnell stating "It’s different, it’s unusual, and it’s the first time anything like this has been tried in [the United States.] Ultimately, it’s up to the individuals if they’re going to get married. But hopefully, if it works, they’ll fall in love."

Episodes

Reception
Sheerly Avni of Salon criticized the series as "an orgy of vanilla heterophilia, a fantasy of a straight, lily-white America that should have gone the way of the original Star Trek enterprise."

Controversies
WRAZ, a Fox affiliate in the Raleigh-Durham area, refused to broadcast future episodes of the series following the premiere of the second episode. The affiliate claimed that they contacted Fox to express their concerns over the series' concept, in which they stated that it "demeans and exploits the institution of marriage."

FCC fine
Over a year after the show's cancellation, the FCC fined Fox a record $1.2 million claiming that an episode which featured pixelated strippers  and a woman licking whipped cream off a man's nipple during a bachelor party violated the FCC's decency laws The ruling underwent great scrutiny when blogger Jeff Jarvis uncovered that although the FCC originally claimed to have received 159 complaints, it later admitted to only receiving 90, which came from only 23 people. Jarvis studied the complaints and determined that all but two were virtually identical to each other, meaning that the $1.2 million judgment was based on original complaints written by a total of only three people. The fine was reduced to $91,000 in January 2009.

References

2000s American reality television series
2003 American television series debuts
2003 American television series endings
American dating and relationship reality television series
Fox Broadcasting Company original programming
Television controversies in the United States
Television series by Rocket Science Laboratories